Oliver J. Brooks was an African American artist who specialized in portraits.

Early life 

Brooks was born in St. Louis, Missouri, in August 1872.

Career 
Brooks' paintings, in oil and pastel, are often found on the walls of churches, colleges, and schools in Missouri, Kansas and many others. His studio was in Kansas City, Kansas.

Brooks also used crayons in some of his art.

On December 23, 1896, Brooks married Loueva J. Simpkins.

References 

1872 births
Painters from Missouri
African-American artists
American artists
Year of death missing
Artists from St. Louis